This is a list of the Sweden national football team results from 1990 to 1999.

1990

1991

1992

1993

1994

1995

1996

1997

1998

1999

Appearances

External links
Results at RSSSF 

1990s in Sweden
1990s